Rozaliya Ilfatovna Galiyeva (born 28 April 1977), also known as Roza Galieva, is a retired artistic gymnast who competed in the 1992 Summer Olympics and 1996 Summer Olympics.

Personal life 
Galiyeva was born on 26 April 1977 in Olmaliq, Uzbek SSR (now Uzbekistan). She became a Russian citizen in 1995. With her husband Mikhail, she has one son, Nikita, and one daughter, Tatyana.

Career

1991 to 1994 
Galiyeva began competing internationally for the USSR in 1991, sharing in the team gold medal at the 1991 World Championships in Indianapolis.

She competed with the Unified Team at the 1992 Olympics in Barcelona, Spain. She exceeded expectations in the preliminary competition, finishing 8th and qualifying for the individual all-around final behind teammates Svetlana Boguinskaya and Tatiana Lysenko.

However, before the all-around, coach Alexander Alexandrov pulled Galiyeva from the competition, citing a knee injury. Her replacement was teammate Tatiana Gutsu. Although Gutsu had fallen from the balance beam in the team finals, she was renowned for her extreme difficulty and the reigning European all-around champion and a Worlds medalist on bars and beam. It was later revealed that Galiyeva's injury was non-existent, and that the substitution was made because Gutsu was considered to have better medal-winning potential. Indeed, Gutsu emerged from the Olympic all-around as the gold medalist. While Gutsu split her prize money with Galiyeva, Galiyeva always remained angry about this turn of events.

After the 1992 Olympics, Galiyeva competed for Uzbekistan.

For Russia 
After receiving Russian citizenship in 1995, Galiyeva began competing for the Russian team. Her first major meet for Russia was the European Championships in 1996 where she won gold on balance beam, beating such renowned gymnasts as Gina Gogean and former teammate Svetlana Boguinskaya, who was now competing for Belarus.

As the only returning Olympian, Galiyeva was named team captain of the Russian squad at the 1996 Olympic Games in Atlanta. However, these Olympics would also prove to be less than positive for her. The Russian squad was disappointed in the team finals, where they finished second to the United States after leading for the first half of the competition. Galiyeva, along with other gymnasts such as Lavinia Miloșovici, Simona Amânar and Svetlana Khorkina, were distracted by the rowdy American crowd. In the team finals, Galiyeva competed on floor exercise just after Kerri Strug's vault that won the gold for the USA; the cheering crowd watched Galiyeva with more attention than they had her teammates, but the spotlight was elsewhere. The situation was repeated two days later in the all-around finals, when Galiyeva was performing, again on floor exercise, while American favorite Shannon Miller was on balance beam, and Galiyeva could not properly hear her music over the deafening crowd noise when Miller's impressive routine ended, and again when the score was flashed.

Individually, Galiyeva finished in the top 10 (7th) in the all-around competition, fulfilling her goal to compete, but again she was disappointed. A balance beam medal seemed easily in her reach in event finals (her team optionals and all-around beam scores would have been enough to tie her for first and second respectively). However, although she started confidently and at first looked to be a contender for the gold, she fell on a front somersault near the end of her routine and finished in 7th place on that event. She had also earned a slot in the event finals for vault, but finished just shy of a medal there, in 4th.

After Atlanta, Galiyeva participated in exhibition tours and competitions in the United States. Her last major competition was the World University Games in 1997.

Post-competitive career 
After retiring from competition, Galiyeva performed in an ice skating show, Moscow Circus on Ice, and judged gymnastics competitions in Russia.

Competitive history

Competitor for Russia

Competitor for Uzbekistan

Competitor for CIS

Competitor for Soviet Union

Major results 

1997 World University Games: 1st team; 2nd BB
1996 Olympic Games: 2nd team; 7th AA; 4th VT; 7th BB
1996 World Championships: 6th FX
1996 European Championships: 1st BB; 2nd team; 5th VT
1995 Olympic Test Event: 1st FX; 2nd AA; 2nd UB; 6th VT
1993 World Championships: 6th AA
1992 Olympic Games: 1st team
1992 World Championships: 2nd UB; 3rd BB; 4th FX (all prelims)
1992 Moscow World Stars: 1st BB; 2nd FX; 4th AA
1991 World Championships: 1st team
1991 Moscow World Stars: 5th AA; 8th UB
1991 USSR Nationals: 4th AA

See also 
 List of Olympic female gymnasts for Russia

References

External links
 
 Rozalia's Republik, an unofficial web resource on Galiyeva
 Complete List of Competition Results at Gymn Forum

1977 births
Living people
Soviet female artistic gymnasts
Uzbekistani female artistic gymnasts
Russian female artistic gymnasts
Olympic gold medalists for the Unified Team
Olympic silver medalists for Russia
Olympic gymnasts of the Unified Team
Olympic gymnasts of Russia
Gymnasts at the 1992 Summer Olympics
Gymnasts at the 1996 Summer Olympics
Medalists at the World Artistic Gymnastics Championships
People from Olmaliq
Olympic medalists in gymnastics
Medalists at the 1996 Summer Olympics
Medalists at the 1992 Summer Olympics
Universiade medalists in gymnastics
Universiade bronze medalists for Russia
Medalists at the 1997 Summer Universiade
European champions in gymnastics